Hamidiye is a village in the Bolvadin District, Afyonkarahisar Province, Turkey. Its population is 291 (2021).

References

Villages in Bolvadin District